This is a chronological list of women's conferences.

19th century
Seneca Falls Convention, 1848, Seneca Falls, New York, first women's rights convention
Rochester Women's Rights Convention of 1848, Rochester, New York
National Women's Rights Convention, 1850, Worcester, Massachusetts, first of an annual series
Ohio Women's Convention at Salem in 1850, Salem, Ohio
Worcester Women's Rights Convention of 1851, Worcester, Massachusetts, second in the series
Syracuse Women's Rights Convention of 1852, Syracuse, New York, third in the series
Cleveland Women's Rights Convention of 1853, Cleveland, Ohio, fourth in the series
Philadelphia Women's Rights Convention of 1854, Philadelphia, Pennsylvania, fifth in the series
Cincinnati Women's Rights Convention of 1855, Cincinnati, Ohio, sixth in the series
New York Women's Rights Convention of 1856, New York, seventh in the series
New York Women's Rights Convention of 1858, New York, eighth in the series
New York Women's Rights Convention of 1860, New York, ninth in the series
First Woman's National Loyal League Convention, 1863, New York, organized to abolish slavery
New York Women's Rights Convention of 1866, New York, eleventh in the series
Washington Women's Rights Convention of 1869, Washington, D.C., twelfth in the series
International Congress of Women, general heading used since 1878 with the International Congress of Women's Rights, Paris
Jewish Women's Congress, 1893, Chicago, Illinois
First National Conference of the Colored Women of America, 1895, Boston, Massachusetts

20th century
First Conference of the International Woman Suffrage Alliance, 1902, Washington, D.C.
Second Conference of the International Woman Suffrage Alliance, 1904, Berlin, Germany
Third Conference of the International Woman Suffrage Alliance, 1906, Copenhagen, Denmark
International Socialist Women's Conferences, series of conferences beginning in Stuttgart, Germany, in 1907
Fourth Conference of the International Woman Suffrage Alliance, 1908, Amsterdam
Fifth Conference of the International Woman Suffrage Alliance, 1909, London
Second International Socialist Women's Conference, 1910, Copenhagen, Denmark
Latin American and Caribbean Feminist Encuentros series of on-going conferences to discuss the role of feminism (1981-)
Sixth Conference of the International Woman Suffrage Alliance, 1911, Stockholm, Sweden
Seventh Conference of the International Woman Suffrage Alliance, 1913, Budapest, Hungary
Third International Socialist Women's Conference, 1915, Berne, Switzerland
Women at the Hague, 1915, international conference in The Hague, Netherlands
Informal International Socialist Women's Conference, 1917, Stockholm, Sweden
Congress of Allied Women on War Service, international congress held Paris in August 1918
Inter-Allied Women's Conference, February–April 1919, parallel conference to the Paris Peace Conference
1919 International Congress of Working Women, Washington, D.C., 28 delegates from 11 countries
International Conference of Communist Women, 1920, Moscow, Soviet Russia
Eighth Conference of the International Woman Suffrage Alliance, 1920, Geneva
Pan-American Conference of Women, 1922, Baltimore, Maryland
All India Women's Conference, founded 1927, today over 100,000 members
International Conference for Women Leaders, biennial conference in Israel, first held 1961
International Conference of Women Engineers and Scientists, 1964, New York, USA, series of ongoing conferences every 3–4 years
Connecticut College Black Womanhood Conference, 1969, first of its kind on an American campus
Conferencia de Mujeres por la Raza, 1971, first national Chicana women's conference
Women's Caucus for Art, 1972, San Francisco, formed by women in the College Art Association
World Conference on Women, 1975, Mexico City, first of a series held by the United Nations
Women's Ordination Conference, 1975, Detroit, Michigan, advocating ordination of women in the Roman Catholic Church
1977 National Women's Conference, held in Houston, Texas, with 2,000 delegates and over 15,000 observers
1977 Women's National Conference: Minority-Latino-Women 
World Conference on Women, 1980, Copenhagen, Denmark, second in a series held by the United Nations
First Latin American and Caribbean Feminist Encuentro, 1981, Bogotá, Colombia
Second Latin American and Caribbean Feminist Encuentro, 1983, Lima, Peru
World Conference on Women, 1985, Nairobi, Kenya, third in a series held by the United Nations
Third Latin American and Caribbean Feminist Encuentro, 1985, Bertioga, Brazil
Fourth Latin American and Caribbean Feminist Encuentro, 1987, Taxco, Mexico
Central California Women's Conference, founded 1988, Fresno, California
California Governor & First Lady's Conference on Women, 1985, held in Long Beach, California since 1993
Fifth Latin American and Caribbean Feminist Encuentro, 1991, San Bernardo, Argentina
Primer Encuentro de Mujeres Negras de América Latina y El Caribe (First Meeting of Latin American and Caribbean Women Negras), 1992, Santo Domingo, Dominican Republic, 300 representatives from 32 countries
Sixth Latin American and Caribbean Feminist Encuentro, 1993, Costa del Sol, El Salvador
World Conference on Women, 1995, Beijing, convened by the United Nations
Seventh Latin American and Caribbean Feminist Encuentro, 1996, Cartagena, Chile
Win Conference, annual conference first held in 1998 in Milan, Italy
Eighth Latin American and Caribbean Feminist Encuentro, 1999, Juan Dolio, Dominican Republic

21st century
Ninth Latin American and Caribbean Feminist Encuentro, 2002, Playa Tambor, Costa Rica
The Women's Conference, renamed in 2004, started as the California Governor & First Lady's Conference on Women in 1985
Tenth Latin American and Caribbean Feminist Encuentro, 2005, Serra Negra, Brazil
Eleventh Latin American and Caribbean Feminist Encuentro, 2009, Mexico City, Mexico
Twelfth Latin American and Caribbean Feminist Encuentro, 2011, Bogotá, Colombia
Trust Women Conference, annual conference first held in 2012, organized by the Thomson Reuters Foundation
Thirteenth Latin American and Caribbean Feminist Encuentro, 2014, Lima, Peru
50/50 Day, 2017, working towards a more gender-balanced world
All India Women Activists Conference-Multilingual, 2020, working for exposure of women's hidden talent in every field. Organised by 'MEGAH'All India Women Activists Association, Odisha Branch.

See also
List of women's organizations
List of women's rights conventions in the United States

References 

Lists of organizations

Human rights-related lists
Lists of conferences
Conferences